Deportivo Pacífico is a Peruvian football club, from the city of Tumbes.

The club were founded on July 6, 1949 and play in the Copa Perú which is the third division of the Peruvian league.

History
The club have played at the highest level of Peruvian football on two occasions, from 1990 Torneo Descentralizado until 1991 Torneo Descentralizado when was relegated to the Copa Perú.

Honours

Regional
Liga Departamental de Tumbes:
 Winners (1): 1988
Runner-up (1): 1987

Liga Superior de Tumbes:
Runner-up (1): 2010

Liga Distrital de Zarumilla:
Runner-up (1): 2019

See also
List of football clubs in Peru
Peruvian football league system

Football clubs in Peru